The governing body of certain islands is the island council. The body exists in the following regions:
the 24 local councils of Kiribati: Subdivisions of Kiribati
the 4 (-1983), 5 (1983–2010) or 6 (1983–1986) island areas of the former Netherlands Antilles: Island council (Netherlands Antilles)
the 3 special municipalities of the Netherlands in the Caribbean Netherlands (2010-): Island council (Netherlands)
the Pitcairn Islands: Island Council (Pitcairn)
Tristan da Cunha: Tristan da Cunha Island Council

See also
Ascension Island Council
King Island Council
Islands council areas of Scotland
Council of Rotuma
Chatham Islands Council
Nevis Island Assembly
Tobago House of Assembly
Autonomous Region of Príncipe
Rodrigues Regional Assembly
Regional Government of Príncipe
Parliament of Åland
 Cabildo insular (Canary Islands)
 Consejo Insular (Balearic Islands)